The R188 road is a regional road in Ireland, located in County Cavan and County Monaghan.

References

Regional roads in the Republic of Ireland
Roads in County Cavan
Roads in County Monaghan